Namudag is a village in Chhatarpur Block in Palamu district of Jharkhand state, India. It is located 48 km towards the north from the district headquarters Daltonganj, 12 km from Chhattarpur, and 177 km from state capital Ranchi. Namudag Pin code is 822113 and the postal head office is Chhatarpur. Marwa (4 km), Munkeri (5 km), Khairadohar (6 km), Bara (6 km), and mahuwari and Karkata (7 km) are the nearby villages to Namudag. Namudag is surrounded by Dumaria Block towards the north, Patan Block towards the south, Hariharganj Block towards the north, and Kutumba Block towards the north.

Hussainabad, Daltonganj, Aurangabad, and Garhwa are the nearby cities of Namudag.

This place is on the border of the Palamu District and Aurangabad district. Aurangabad District Kutumba is north towards this place. It is near to the Bihar state border.

Villages in Palamu district